Addis Fortune (also known as Fortune) is a private and independent newspaper based in Addis Ababa, Ethiopia.

Overview
It is reportedly the largest English-language weekly in the country. Its circulation is often quoted at a meager 7,500 copies per week in a country with a population of 100 million. However, its rival, Capital, which is also based in Addis Ababa, recently claimed to have topped Fortune in circulation in a project launched to celebrate its ten-year anniversary. Fortune still claims to be the largest circulating paper in its category, surpassing all others in the competition by an average of 60%. Its current editor-in-chief is Samson Hailu.

History 
The newspaper was first issued in the year 2000. Making it the 14th or 15th newspaper to be issued in Ethiopia.

References

Weekly newspapers published in Ethiopia
English-language newspapers published in Africa
Mass media in Addis Ababa